Anton Petrov may refer to:

 Anton Petrov (footballer, born 1985), Bulgarian football player
 Anton Petrov (footballer, born 1994), Russian football player